Huaxun railway station is a station on the Zhengzhou–Jinan high-speed railway. The station serves both Hua County and Xun County, hence the name of the station. It opened with the initial section of the railway, between Zhengzhou East and Puyang East, on 20 June 2022.

Originally there was some dispute between the counties about the location of a station on the line for each of them individually. Eventually it was settled that a single station was to be built on the boundary between the counties and named after both counties, with both sides having their own station entrance, thus saving construction cost for two separate stations. The Hua County side building in the south of the station has architecture inspired by the Xia, Shang and Zhou dynasties. The Xun County side is inspired by the Tang and Han dynasty.

References 

Railway stations in Henan
Railway stations in China opened in 2022